Iju Solomon Christopher Wariso (born 11 November 1966 in Portsmouth) is a male retired English sprinter who competed primarily in the 200 and 400 metres.

Personal life
Born to Nigerian parents in Portsmouth where his father was stationed with the navy, Wariso's family moved to London in 1971.

Athletics career
He represented his country at two outdoor and three indoor World Championships and is the British record holder in the indoor 4 × 400 metres relay.

He represented England in the 400 metres and won a silver medal in the 4 x 400 metres relay event, at the 1998 Commonwealth Games in Kuala Lumpur, Malaysia.

He tested positive for an illegal stimulant, ephedrine, in 1994 and was banned from competing for three months, despite his claims that he took the substance unknowingly in a herbal supplement.

International competitions

Personal bests
Outdoor
100 metres – 10.33 (-2.3 m/s) (Geneva, 1994)
200 metres – 20.50 (+0.6 m/s) (Birmingham, 1995)
400 metres – 44.68 (Birmingham, 1998)
Indoor
60 metres – 6.85 (Stuttgart, 1998)
200 metres – 20.84 (Birmingham, 1995)
400 metres – 45.71 (Birmingham, 1998)

See also
List of doping cases in athletics

References

1966 births
Living people
Sportspeople from Portsmouth
English male sprinters
World Athletics Championships athletes for Great Britain
Commonwealth Games medallists in athletics
Athletes (track and field) at the 1998 Commonwealth Games
Doping cases in athletics
English sportspeople in doping cases
English people of Nigerian descent
Commonwealth Games silver medallists for England
World Athletics Indoor Championships medalists
Medallists at the 1998 Commonwealth Games